Hwang Gicheon (황기천, 1760–1821) was a Korean painter of the late Joseon period. He had several pen names, including Changwon (昌原), Huido (羲圖), Neungsan (菱山), and Huwan (后晥).

Hwang's great-grandfather was Hwang Yusa (黃有師), his grandfather Hwang Chae (黃寀), biological father Hwang Injo (黃仁照), father Hwang Inyeong (鐵原鎭兵馬僉節制使 - 黃仁煐), maternal grandfather Min Baekbok (閔百福), and brother Hwang Giseong (黃基性).

In 1792, he passed his first governmental examination (壬子 式年試 生員), Class 2 Category 13.

In 1794, he passed his liberal arts examination (甲寅 庭試 丙科), Category 17.
 
Hwang was promoted to the government position Rank 6 (六品) and became Minister of the Interior (吏曹正郞) without first filling the Chung-Hwan position (淸宦職).

In 1801, Hwang received the positions of MoonSaRang (問事郞), Gang-Dong Governor (江東縣監), Judge (正言), Ji-Pyung (持平), and JongBuSiJeong (宗簿寺正). In 1806, after not attending a government meeting to impeach the second vice-premier, Kim Dal-Soon (金達淳), he was exiled to Yong-Chun (龍川) and then transferred to GoKumDo (古今島), but in 1809, he was pardoned due to the birth of Ik-Jong (翼宗). 
 
In 1820, he was appointed governor of Kyung-Sang State (慶尙道都事), but soon thereafter, he resigned.
 
He was talented in sentence construction and calligraphy (e.g., traditional (篆書), simplified (隷書), cursive (楷書), and hand-written (草書)).

1760 births
1821 deaths
Korean politicians
18th-century Korean calligraphers
19th-century Korean calligraphers
18th-century Korean painters
19th-century Korean painters